Pakhral (Mirpur) is a village in Khari Sharif, AJK, Pakistan. It is located on the left side of the Jhelum River. As of the 1998 Pakistani census, its population was 697.

Education 
Pakhral Village has a primary school run by the government of AJK, and consists of 5 grades:
 Grade 1: 5–6 years old
 Grade 2: 6–7 years old
 Grade 3: 7–8 years old
 Grade 4: 8–9 years old

References

Populated places in Mirpur District